I'm a Big Girl Now is  an American sitcom that aired on ABC from October 31, 1980, until May 8, 1981. The series, from Soap creator Susan Harris and producers Paul Junger Witt and Tony Thomas, was created and developed as a star vehicle for Diana Canova, in an attempt to capitalize on her success playing Corinne Tate Flotsky on Soap. The theme song, "I'm a Big Girl Now", words by Leslie Bricusse and music by George Tipton, is sung by Canova.

Synopsis
Canova starred as Diana Cassidy, a young divorcee and mother who, along with her daughter Becky, moves back home with her recently single father and dentist Benjamin, played by Danny Thomas.

Cast
Diana Canova as Diana Cassidy
Danny Thomas as Dr. Benjamin Douglas D.D.S.
Rori King as Becky Cassidy
Sheree North as Edie McKendrick
Martin Short as Neal Stryker
Deborah Baltzell as Karen Hawks
Michael Durrell as Walter Douglas

Episodes

References

External links
 

1980s American sitcoms
American Broadcasting Company original programming
1980 American television series debuts
1981 American television series endings
English-language television shows
Television series about families
Television series by ABC Studios
Television shows set in Massachusetts